Wavell Wayne Hinds (born 7 September 1976) is a former West Indian international cricketer, who played all formats of the game. He was a left-handed batsman and occasional right-arm medium-pace bowler.

Hinds played 45 Test matches for the West Indies between 2000 and 2005, and 119 One Day Internationals between 1999 and 2010. He also played five Twenty20 Internationals between 2006 and 2010. Hinds is currently the president of the West Indies Players' Association (WIPA), a role he has held since 2012.

International career
On 17 March 2000 Hinds made his Test debut in the second test against Zimbabwe at the Queen's Park Oval, Port of Spain, Trinidad and Tobago. On 2 April 2000 Hinds scored his maiden ODI century, 116 not out, against the Zimbabweans in the second game of the 2000 Cable & Wireless ODI Series. On 19 May 2000 he notched his first Test Match century, 165 against Pakistan, in the second test at Barbados' Kensington Oval.

During the 5th test of the West Indies' 2000-01 tour of Australia, Hinds put on an opening stand of 147 with Sherwin Campbell. This became the highest opening partnership for the Windies in Australia, surpassing 135 notched by both Gordon Greenidge and Desmond Haynes in the 1988-89 season. For the next few years Hinds formed a notable opening pairing with Chris Gayle. In Tests they put on 1300 runs together at 39.39 in 33 innings. Their ODI opening partnership saw them compile 1687 runs in 41 matches at an average of 41.15 with four century and five 50 plus stands.

In 2003 he made successive ODI hundreds against Australia at Grenada, both unbeaten and both in victories for the West Indies. 

He later picked up figures of 2 for 24 against Pakistan, with his medium pace, in the 2004 ICC Champions Trophy semi final and career best figures of 3 for 24 from 10 overs against England, in the final, which was eventually won by the Windies.

His highest Test score of 213 was made against South Africa at Georgetown in 2005 and included 34 fours and 2 sixes. He put on 284 for the 4th wicket with Shivnarine Chanderpaul who also made a double hundred making it one of the few occasions where two players have passed 200 in the same innings. Hinds however struggled soon after and again found himself on the sidelines. He made a brief return to the side in May for an ODI series against India but failed to impress and lost any chance he had of gaining inclusion in the World Cup squad.

Domestic career
In October 2007, he signed a one-year contract to feature, in the 2008 season, as a Kolpak player for English county side Derbyshire.

He played in the Indian Cricket League for the Ahmedabad Rockets in the first half of 2008, although he did not return in season 2.

References

External links

1976 births
Living people
Ahmedabad Rockets cricketers
Cricketers at the 1998 Commonwealth Games
Derbyshire cricketers
Jamaican cricketers
West Indies One Day International cricketers
West Indies Test cricketers
West Indies Twenty20 International cricketers
Sportspeople from Kingston, Jamaica
Jamaica cricketers
Jamaican expatriates in the United Kingdom
Commonwealth Games competitors for Jamaica